Mistletoe is an unincorporated community located in Owsley County, Kentucky, United States. Its post office closed in January 2004. The community was named for the mistletoe native to the area.

References

Unincorporated communities in Owsley County, Kentucky
Unincorporated communities in Kentucky